Emory McClintock (1840–1916), born John Emory McClintock was an American actuary, born in Carlisle, Pennsylvania.  He graduated from Columbia University, where he was tutor in mathematics in 1859–1860.  From 1863 to 1866 he served as United States consular agent at Bradford, England.  He served as president of the American Mathematical Society in 1890–1894 and of the Actuarial Society of America in 1895–1897.

Early life and career
He was born to John and Caroline Augusta Wakeman McClintock.  His father was a minister of the Methodist Episcopal Church, who was also a Professor of  mathematics, and ancient languages at Dickinson College in Carlisle.  His father was also involved in an 1847 a riot over slavery, as he tried to prevent slavechasers from taking African-American citizens of Pennsylvania into slavery.
He was actuary of the Asbury Life Insurance Company, New York (1867–1871), of the Northwestern Mutual Life Insurance Company, Milwaukee, Wisconsin, (1871–1889), and of the Mutual Life Insurance Company, New York (1889–1911).  Of the Mutual he was vice president in 1905–1911, trustee after 1905, and consulting actuary after 1911.

References

 Thomas S. Fiske, Emory McClintock, Bulletin of the American Mathematical Society, 23, (1917), pp. 353–357. (includes a list of his publications)

External links

 
 
 Archives and Special Collections, Dickinson College, J. Emory McClintock, Family Papers 1853-1918
 

Columbia University faculty
Columbia University alumni
1840 births
People from Carlisle, Pennsylvania
1916 deaths
People from Milwaukee
American actuaries
Presidents of the American Mathematical Society
19th-century American businesspeople